Huang Erh-hsuan (5 March 1936 – 9 February 2019) was a Taiwanese politician. He served in the Legislative Yuan from 1993 to 2002.

Education and early career
Huang earned a Ph.D from National Chengchi University after completing a bachelor's degree from National Taiwan University. He later taught at NCCU, Soochow University and National Chung Hsing University. Huang wrote for the Independence Evening Post and published CommonWealth Magazine.

Political career
Huang was a member of the Democratic Progressive Party's New Tide faction, and was the party's first secretary general between 1986 and 1988. He was elected to three terms on the Legislative Yuan via party list proportional representation from 1993 to 2002. Upon stepping down from the legislature, Huang was named the president of a Pan-Green Internet radio station hosted at TaiwaneseVoice.net.

Death
Huang died of heart failure on 9 February 2019, aged 82. Following his death, the Transitional Justice Commission probed Huang's 1983 firing from Soochow University. The agency concluded in April 2019 that the departure of Huang from Soochow was a result of political persecution from Ministry of Education and intelligence agencies in Taiwan.

References

1936 births
2019 deaths
National Chengchi University alumni
Academic staff of the National Chengchi University
Academic staff of Soochow University (Taiwan)
Politicians of the Republic of China on Taiwan from Tainan
Democratic Progressive Party Members of the Legislative Yuan
Party List Members of the Legislative Yuan
Members of the 2nd Legislative Yuan
Members of the 3rd Legislative Yuan
Members of the 4th Legislative Yuan
Academic staff of the National Chung Hsing University
National Taiwan University alumni